The Common Algebraic Specification Language (CASL) is a general-purpose specification language based on first-order logic with induction. Partial functions and subsorting are also supported.

Overview
CASL has been designed by CoFI, the Common Framework Initiative (CoFI), with the aim to subsume many existing specification languages.

CASL comprises four levels:
 basic specifications, for the specification of single software modules,
 structured specifications, for the modular specification of modules,
 architectural specifications, for the prescription of the structure of implementations,
 specification libraries, for storing specifications distributed over the Internet.

The four levels are orthogonal to each other. In particular, it is possible to use CASL structured and architectural specifications and libraries with logics other than CASL. For this purpose, the logic has to be formalized as an institution. This feature is also used by the CASL extensions.

Extensions
Several extensions of CASL have been designed: 
HasCASL, a higher-order extension
CoCASL, a coalgebraic extension
CspCASL, a concurrent extension based on CSP
ModalCASL, a modal logic extension
CASL-LTL, a temporal logic extension
HetCASL, an extension for heterogeneous specification

External links
Official CoFI website
CASL
The heterogeneous tool set Hets, the main analysis tool for CASL

Formal specification languages